Bernac is the name or part of the name of the following communes in France:

 Bernac, Charente, in the Charente department
 Bernac, Tarn, in the Tarn department
 Bernac-Debat, in the Hautes-Pyrénées department
 Bernac-Dessus, in the Hautes-Pyrénées department
 Loubès-Bernac, in the Lot-et-Garonne department

People with the surname Bernac
 Pierre Bernac, French baritone (1899-1979)